The Karl Schwarzschild Observatory is a German astronomical observatory in Tautenburg near Jena, Thuringia. 

It was founded in 1960 as an affiliated institute of the former German Academy of Sciences at Berlin and named in honour of the astronomer and physicist Karl Schwarzschild (1873–1916). In 1992, the institute was re-established as Thuringian State Observatory (Thüringer Landessternwarte, TLS).

The observatory has the largest telescope located in Germany, which is also the largest Schmidt camera in the world. Made by VEB Zeiss Jena (the branch of Carl Zeiss located in Jena in what was then East Germany), this instrument is known as (2m) Alfred Jensch Telescope: though its mirror is 2 metres in diameter, the telescope's aperture is 1.34 m.

The observatory has observed several exoplanets and brown dwarfs, as around the stars HD 8673, 30 Arietis, 4 Ursae Majoris, and around HD 13189 on 5 April 2005. The observatory also hosts an International station for the interferometric radio telescope LOFAR.

See also 
 
 Bernhard Schmidt
 List of astronomical observatories

References

External links

 
 Interview with director on ESA's plans for finding Earth-like planets

Astronomical observatories in Germany
Buildings and structures in Saale-Holzland-Kreis
Low-Frequency Array (LOFAR)
1960 establishments in East Germany
Science and technology in East Germany